Katulph was a Hephthalite aristocrat, who served as the advisor of the Sasanian king (shah) Khosrow I.

Sources 
  

Khosrow I
Hephthalites
People from the Sasanian Empire
6th-century people